The Story of the Jews may refer to:
The Story of the Jews (book), work by British historian Simon Schama
The Story of the Jews (TV series), based on Schama's book